Muhammad Hassan Adnan Syed, (born 15 May 1974, in Lahore) is a Pakistani former cricketer who has played for the cricket teams of Islamabad, Water and Power Development Authority, Gujranwala, Derbyshire and Lahore.

One of the most adaptable Pakistani batsmen today, and regarded particularly for his skills in slow accumulation of runs rather than blistering pace or skill, he became Derbyshire's Player of the Year in 2004, and subsequently the next year found himself suffering from a dip in form in 2005. His best career score to date, of 191, came during September 2005. He now has British citizenship.
 
Adnan left Derbyshire at the end of September 2007. He is now an umpire, and in March 2019 stood in the match between Derbyshire and Leeds/Bradford MCCU in the opening round of Marylebone Cricket Club University Matches.

References

External links 
Cricket Online Profile
Hassan Adnan at Cricket Archive

1975 births
Living people
English cricketers
English cricket umpires
Lahore cricketers
Pakistani emigrants to the United Kingdom
British Asian cricketers
British sportspeople of Pakistani descent
Derbyshire cricketers
Gujranwala cricketers
Islamabad cricketers
Water and Power Development Authority cricketers
Suffolk cricketers
Cricketers from Lahore
Pakistani cricketers
Pakistan Customs cricketers
English cricketers of the 21st century
Pakistani emigrants to England
Naturalised citizens of the United Kingdom